Two Loves is a 1961 American drama film directed by Charles Walters and starring Shirley MacLaine, Laurence Harvey, Jack Hawkins, and Nobu McCarthy. It is based on the book Spinster by Sylvia Ashton-Warner. It was entered into the 11th Berlin International Film Festival.

Plot
American Anna Vorontosov (Shirley MacLaine) teaches the younger children, mostly Maori, at a rural school on New Zealand's North Island. She has made teaching the focus of her life. Her classroom is disorganized and chaotic, which she believes gives these children the freedom to learn. She arrives at her class one morning to learn from her students that a new superintendent of schools stopped by earlier. Worried, Anna talks to the school's headmaster, Mr. Reardon (Ronald Long), about how she can best present her class as she wants to the new superintendent without he firing her. They decide that getting one of the older girls in the school to help her for a few weeks is the appropriate solution. That girl will come from the class of fellow teacher, motorcycle riding Paul Lathrope (Laurence Harvey), a brash Brit who has been at the school now for six months. As Paul and Anna scope out the girls for the assistant position, he asks her why she has not yet made any attempt to get to know him better outside the school confines, implying that he is attracted to her. She innocently brushes off his advances, as she is inexperienced and prudish about sex, especially out of wedlock. As her assistant, they choose 15 year old Whareparita (Nobu McCarthy), a Maori girl who is honored as she idolizes Miss Vorontosov. As Anna and Whareparita go back to her classroom, Anna is amazed to see her students quietly sitting at their desks. They tell her it's because the new superintendent, William W.J. Abercrombie (Jack Hawkins), who told them to do so, is in the back room of her class. Meeting him, Anna, without being asked, immediately goes into a diatribe of why she does the things the way she does in her classroom, all in not having any rules that come between her and her students. Abercrombie seems confused, he only interested in a book she has, it a work composed by the children but compiled by her. He would like to borrow it. She believes its contents will shock him as unorthodox.

During recess, Mark Cutter (Neil Woodward), one of Anna's few Caucasian students, enters the classroom while she is relaxing at her desk. He initially refuses to remove his shoes as she asks, since his mother told him that only uncouth Maoris do so. Anna is able to convince him to do so regardless. He then tells her that his best friend, a Maori boy named Matawhero (Edmund Vargas) ran away and will not be returning to school, Matawhero who often helps her in class. Incensed that Matawhero has dropped out of school, she rushes off to the Maori compound where Matawhero lives, and which is led by his grandfather, the largely westernized Chief Rauhuia (Juano Hernandez). The Chief believes Miss Vorontosov a saint since she has taught Matawhero to read and write. She learns directly from Matawhero, who was hiding in the room listening to the conversation, that he ran off because someone at school hit him with a big stick. He refuses to tell who, she only hoping that it was not one of the Caucasian children, which would cause problems. She is able to persuade Matawhero to return to school with her. As they arrive back at the school, she can tell by Matawhero's reaction that the person who hit him was Mr. Lathrope. She begins to berate Paul for using fear as a method of discipline, especially on a little boy. Paul admits to her of his insecurities: that he doesn't do his job well, this being his first ever teaching job, and that he plans on quitting at the end of term. He further tells her of his dream to be a singer. This discussion softens her perspective of him. They agree to a date this evening at her place, where he will sing for her, as he knows she has a piano as he has often heard her play as he passes by her house in the morning.

Later at her house, Paul sings a German song for Anna while she accompanies him on the piano. His rendition of the song is ballsy and obvious. He believes it was great, he always singing with whatever emotion he is feeling. She tries to provide him with some constructive criticism, which he does not take well. He admits that anything he touches figuratively turns out badly. She tries to show compassion, which he wants to believe is romantic interest. When he approaches her romantically, even stating that he would like to stay the night, her prudish self retreats. As he storms off, he tells her that she is already in a relationship: with her students.

During the middle of one of Anna's classes, Abercrombie arrives, wanting to speak to her about the book he borrowed. He reads one of the stories included, in which a student talks about a jailed father, a knife fight and the family having no money. He is amazed that children that young even know the word knife when seen as spelled. Anna passionately tells him that the children will learn only if they feel, and not reading about "Tom having fun" as is the case with most western readers, such stories which have no cultural context for her children.

Anna continues to have encounters with Paul outside of the school, most either by chance or on Paul's initiative. They include a chance encounter one rainy evening in town while Paul is drunk and which she helps him home. Another is when he appears outside her house in the middle of the night, again drunk. Another is on a staff outing to Mount Taranaki, he who is waiting for her at her house following the mountain hike. These encounters generally demonstrate Paul's childlike behavior in his pursuit of her, and his loneliness and his seemingly friendlessness. Regardless, she can't help but be drawn to him if only in an effort to help him, but not before their encounters usually ending with the two at odds because of her pushing away his sexual advances.

Anna, after a shopping trip to buy school supplies the district will not provide for her, goes to speak to Abercrombie about Paul, she wanting to help him and not get him into trouble. Abercrombie knows all about Paul, and about his troubled past, which includes a difficult stint in the military, and an attempted suicide. Abercrombie fought to keep him on staff despite calls to dismiss him, as he sees in Paul a man with passion underneath his problems. This meeting also begins a process of Anna getting to know about Abercrombie: that he is from England; that his wife and sons were in New Zealand but have returned to London; that their marriage is an unsatisfying one for him as his wife continually pushes him away; and that he too is a lonely man in New Zealand. He slowly begins his own pursuit of Anna.

During a class, Anna and Whareparita are checking for lice in the students' hair, and burning the lice whenever they find any. One of the younger girls starts crying at the thought of being burned. Whareparita is able to comfort her. Watching the interaction, Anna feels that Whareparita is blossoming into a woman in front of her eyes. Anna begins to talk to her about the change into womanhood, Whareparita responding that they have already learned about such things in social hygiene class. Later, on a school outing, Whareparita faints. It is because she is pregnant, about which she is forthright and matter-of-fact in telling Anna. Whareparita feels no need to divulge the father's identity to her as he will not be part of the baby's life, the baby which she and her community of Maori relatives will happily raise. This view is supported by the Chief, who happily will welcome another child into their community. Marriage to the father is not even an issue for Whareparita or her family. Anna is appalled and shocked by the entire situation.

Abercrombie talks to Anna about the book, of which he wants to print several copies as a pilot project with the blessing of the school's council. Anna is shocked but pleased, but she will not allow them to make the editorial changes they want without the children's permission.

After their latest encounter when Anna once again pushed Paul away as he declared his love for her, Paul, late one evening, is drunk, driving his motorcycle on a country road, when he crashes over a hill. He is killed as his motorcycle bursts into flames. At Paul's funeral, Whareparita collapses into tears. Anna then knows that Paul is the one who got Whareparita pregnant, which Whareparita later admits. Anna is in remorse about Paul, she feeling that his death could have been suicide, and that she could have saved him by giving into his wants. Abercrombie knows his death was accidental and that Anna's feeling of guilt is not justified. He admits to her that he loves her and plans to divorce his wife, even if she doesn't want one. Anna, ready to give herself to a man, hugs him.

Abercrombie and Anna are walking side by side at the school, Abercrombie happily whistling as Anna goes into her classroom.

Cast
 Shirley MacLaine as Anna Vorontosov
 Laurence Harvey as Paul Lathrope
 Jack Hawkins as William W.J. Abercrombie
 Nobu McCarthy as Whareparita
 Ronald Long as Headmaster Reardon
 Norah Howard as Mrs. Cutter
 Juano Hernandez as Rauhuia

Reception

Box office
The film earned $425,000 in the U.S. and Canada and $650,000 in other markets, resulting in a loss of $1,773,000.

Legacy
In a 2011 interview with the Naples Daily News, MacLaine referred to the film as "a terrible movie no one has ever heard of."

References

External links
 
 
 
 

1961 films
1961 romantic drama films
American romantic drama films
Films about educators
Films based on New Zealand novels
Films directed by Charles Walters
Films scored by Bronisław Kaper
Films set in New Zealand
Metro-Goldwyn-Mayer films
1960s English-language films
1960s American films